Fort St. John is a city located in northeastern British Columbia, Canada. Located at Mile 47 of the Alaska Highway, it is one of the largest cities between Dawson Creek, British Columbia and Delta Junction, Alaska. Established in 1794 as a trading post, Fort St. John is the oldest European-established settlement in present-day British Columbia. The city is served by the Fort St. John Airport. The municipal slogan is Fort St. John: The Energetic City.

History
Fort St. John is located on the traditional territory of the Dane-zaa a First Nations people. Over the 19th and 20th centuries, the community has been moved a number of times for varying economic reasons. The present location is thought to be its sixth. The original trading post built in the area was named Rocky Mountain House (not to be confused with the modern Alberta town by that name). It was established one year after Sir Alexander Mackenzie explored the area in 1793. One of a series of forts along the Peace River constructed to service the fur trade, it was located southwest of the present site of Fort St. John. The Dane-zaa and Sikanni First Nations used it as a trading post. It was also used as a supply depot for further expeditions into the territory. The fort closed in 1805. Fort d'Epinette was built in 1806 by the North West Company. It was renamed Fort St. John in 1821 following the purchase of the North West Company by the Hudson's Bay Company. It was shut down in 1823. The site was designated a National Historic Site of Canada in 1958.

After a lapse of nearly forty years, Fort St. John was reopened in 1860 on the south side of the Peace River, directly south of the present community. It was moved in 1872 by Francis Work Beatton directly across the river. This community lasted until 1925 when the river ceased to be the main avenue of transportation and the fort was moved closer to where settlers were establishing homesteads. The new town was constructed at Fish Creek, northwest of the present community, on the new trail to Fort Nelson. It did not shut down until 1975. In 1928, C. M. Finch moved his general store to two quarters of land where he also built a government building to house the land, telegraph and post offices. The present site for the town was firmly established after he donated  for a Roman Catholic church and additional land for a hospital.

The first census that recognized Fort St. John as a census subdivision took place in 1951 and recorded 884 people. The population rapidly increased, doubling almost every 5 years for 15 years so that by 1966 there were 6,749 residents living in the community.

Geography
Fort St. John is geographically on the western edge of the Canadian prairies that cover much of Alberta, Saskatchewan, and Manitoba, but is not politically included in the three Canadian Prairie provinces. The city sits between the Peace River and Beatton River, with Charlie Lake nearby.

Prairies lie to the east and north, while to the west the Rocky Mountains form a rain shadow. The city is built on relatively flat, rolling hills.

Fort Saint John, along with neighboring cities of Chetwynd, Tumbler Ridge, and Dawson Creek, are within Peace River Country, a large geographic area of British Columbia and Alberta. The Peace River valley provides opportunities for farming, in contrast to the rugged mountains to the west.

Climate
Fort St. John experiences a cold humid continental climate (close to subarctic), with cold winters and warm summers. Although winters can be frigid, the area has milder winters than much of the rest of Canada (especially considering its northerly latitude) due to the influence of the nearby Rocky Mountains. They tend to block arctic air masses coming in from the north/northwest, although they can certainly still penetrate the area. Fort St. John uses Mountain Standard Time all year (same as Pacific Daylight Time in summer), and because of its northerly latitude experiences short daylight hours in winter and long daylight hours in summer.

Fort St. John is east of the Rocky Mountains, and thus has a climate much more similar to the prairies than the British Columbia interior west of the mountains. The frost-free period is much longer east of the mountains than west, and thus the Peace River area including Fort St. John can grow crops that cannot be grown in most of the province such as wheat and canola.

Fort St. John is one of the sunniest places in the province, especially in the winter and spring. The city holds British Columbia's record for most sunshine ever recorded in March (247.4 hours in 1965), May (373.5 hours in 1972), and November (141.3 hours in 1976).

Demographics

Ethnicity

Religion 
According to the 2021 census, religious groups in Fort St. John included:
Irreligion (12,170 persons or 57.5%)
Christianity (7,685 persons or 36.3%)
Sikhism (490 persons or 2.3%)
Hinduism (290 persons or 1.4%)
Islam (250 persons or 1.2%)
Indigenous Spirituality (60 persons or 0.3%)
Buddhism (50 persons or 0.2%)
Judaism (20 persons or 0.1%)

Economy
 Agriculture has been the mainstay of the economy servicing and providing a market for the upland prairies.

As the urban centre for a rural and farming population of about 8,306 people and home to 18,609 people, Fort St. John is a retail, service and industrial centre. The province's oil and gas industry, including the provincial Oil and Gas Commission is centred in the city. Forestry has become more important to the city since the opening of an oriented strand board plant in 2005. Much wood is exported to the United States.

Fort St. John is a transportation hub and industrial centre serving BC Hydro's nearby hydro-electric facilities, the W.A.C. Bennett Dam, Peace Canyon Dam and Site C dam.

The 2001 Canadian census recorded 9,985 income-earners over the age of 15 residing in Fort St. John; of these, 4,500 worked full-time throughout the year. The high participation rate stems from the relatively young population, much of which was attracted by the area's high-paying oil and gas industry. Its male-female income gap is large.

Health care
Fort St. John has a hospital, which as of 2022, had 44 in patient beds, 4 intensive care unit beds, and 7 delivery beds. It has a CT scanner and ultrasound.

Arts and culture

As the urban centre for approximately 20,000 people, much of the region's recreational and cultural facilities are located in town. Within the city, Centennial Park groups much of these facilities in a central location close to residences and businesses. This large park includes the Fort St. John North Peace Museum, the North Peace Leisure Pool, the North Peace Arena (home of the Fort St. John Huskies), a separate arena for children, an 8-sheet curling rink, as well as an outdoor water park and speed skating oval. In the centre of town is the North Peace Cultural Centre which houses the Fort St. John Public Library, a theatre, and the Peace Gallery North art gallery. Visitors also come to see 'Ms. Bubbles', the world's largest tea-cup pig.

Attractions
The city's main recreation centre is the Fort St. John Enerplex, also known as the Pomeroy Sport Centre, that opened in 2010. It is a three-storey public facility with two National Hockey League-sized ice rinks, a concession, 12 dressing rooms, public meeting rooms, a retail juice outlet, an indoor near-Olympic-sized long track speed skating oval, and a 340 meter long walking track (the "Northern Vac Track"). All ice surfaces can be removed to provide event space in excess of 140,000 square feet. The facility also houses the Energetic Learning Campus, a satellite campus of the nearby North Peace Secondary School.

Fort St. John hosted the BC Winter Games in 1984 and the Northern BC Winter Games in 1975, 1976, 1994, 2000, and 2007. Every August, the Great Canadian Welding Competition is held in Fort St. John, which sees welding artists fill Centennial Park creating statues on the year's given theme. In January the annual High on Ice Winter Carnival has a frozen Centennial Park filled with ice sculptors competing and other special winter-related activities occurring around town.

Government
The City of Fort St. John has a council-manager form of municipal government. A six-member council, along with one mayor, is elected at-large every three years. In the November 19, 2011 civic election Lori Ackerman was elected mayor, replacing the former newspaper publisher Bruce Lantz who served as mayor between 2008 and 2011. In the 2008 election Lantz had defeated one term mayor and former RCMP officer Jim Eglinski who had defeated the incumbent mayor of 15 years, Steve Thorlakson in 2005. The mayor and one city councillor represent Fort St. John on the board of directors of the Peace River Regional District. Seven board of education trustees, for representation on School District 60 Peace River North, are also elected by the city.

Fort St. John is situated in the Peace River North provincial electoral district and is represented by Pat Pimm in the Legislative Assembly of British Columbia. Pimm replaced long-time MLA Richard Neufeld who was first elected as a Member of the Legislative Assembly in the 1991 provincial election with the BC Social Credit Party taking 56% of votes cast at the Fort St. John polls and re-elected with Reform BC in 1996 with 44% support, and with the BC Liberal Party in 2001 and 2005 with 73% and 59% of Fort St. John polls, respectively. He has served as the Minister of Energy, Mines and Petroleum Resources since 2001.

Federally, Fort St. John is located in the Prince George—Peace River riding, which is represented in the House of Commons by Conservative Party Member of Parliament Bob Zimmer, a former high school teacher who lives in Fort St. John. Prior to Zimmer, the riding had been represented by long-time MP Jay Hill, who was born and raised in Fort St. John, and first elected in 1993 and subsequently re-elected in 1997, 2000, and 2004 with 74%, 77%, and 70% support from Fort St. John polls, respectively. Hill was also re-elected in the 2006 and 2008 federal elections. Hill had served as the Government House Leader and was formerly the Secretary of State and Chief Government Whip, as well as the Whip of the Canadian Alliance Party. Before Hill the riding was represented, from 1972 to 1993, by Frank Oberle of the Progressive Conservative Party who served as Minister of State for Science and Technology from 1985 to 1989 and Minister of Forestry from 1990 to 1993.

| style="width: 85px" | Bob Zimmer
|align="right"|3,974
|align="right"|70%
|align="right"|62%

| Lois Boone
|align="right"|1,082
|align="right"|19%
|align="right"|26%

| Hilary Crowley
|align="right"|288
|align="right"|5.1%
|align="right"|6.0%

| Ben Levine
|align="right"|242
|align="right"|4.3%
|align="right"|5.2%

| Jeremy Cote
|align="right"|88
|align="right"|1.6%
|align="right"|1.1%

| Arthur Hadland
|align="right"|763
|align="right"|29%
|align="right"|31%

| Jackie Allen
|align="right"|359
|align="right"|14%
|align="right"|14%

Police 

Police protection is contracted to the Royal Canadian Mounted Police which operates a 26 officer municipal detachment and a 10-member rural detachment from the city. In 2005, the municipal detachment reported 4,048 Criminal Code offences, which translates into a crime rate of 228 Criminal Code offences per 1,000 people, much higher than the provincial average of 125 offences. During that year, compared to the provincial average, the RCMP reported much higher crime rates in Fort St. John for cocaine, cannabis, non-sexual assaults, property damage, and arson related offences. However, the city had lower crime rates for robbery, theft from motor vehicles, and business break-and-enters.

Infrastructure

Fort St. John is the transportation hub of the region. The main highway, Highway 97 (Alaska Highway), built in 1942 by the United States Army, runs through the city, north to Fort Nelson, the Yukon, and Alaska. As the highway goes over the Peace River to Dawson Creek, it reduced the community's dependence on the river for transportation. Within the city the streets are laid out in a grid pattern. The main streets are the north–south 100 Street and the east–west 100 Avenue. The rail line that runs by the eastern and northern borders was extended from Chetwynd by the Pacific Great Eastern Railway with the first train arriving in 1958. The only commercial airport between Dawson Creek and Fort Nelson is the Fort St. John Airport (CYXJ) located a few miles east of the city. The two runway airport has Air Canada Jazz, WestJet and other smaller airlines such as Central Mountain Air and Swanberg Air with regularly scheduled flights and North Cariboo Air providing chartered flights. Greyhound Bus lines, which had a bus stop in the city, operated a route along the highway, north to Whitehorse (via Fort Nelson) and south to Dawson Creek, until the company stopped operations in Western Canada in 2018.

The city's water and sewer infrastructure pumps water from 4 deep wells located near the Peace River with a backup source being Charlie Lake; it is filtered, chlorinated and fluoridated before being distributed. The water has been rated by the BC Ministry of Environment as being "Very hard." Sewage is processed in one of two lagoons. The lagoon south of the city releases the processed effluent into the Peace River and the lagoon north of the city releases into the Beatton River. Storm sewers run with the sanitary sewers but storm discharge is directed into the rivers without going through the lagoons. The city's fire department consists of volunteer and professional members, covering the city plus five miles (8 km) into the rural areas.

Education
There are 9 public schools within the city limits, with one being a secondary school, and another 10 outside of Fort St. John that are all administered by School District 60 Peace River North. There is one private Christian school in Fort St. John, also administered by School District 60 Peace River North. Northern Lights College has a campus in Fort St. John housing the B.C. Centre of Training Excellence in Oil and Gas, which includes a full-sized oil rig and simulated well site. The 2001 Census estimated that 10% of people in Fort St. John between 20 and 64 years old graduated from a university, less than half of the 24% provincial average and 27% did not graduate from secondary school, 7% higher than the provincial average.

Media
The Alaska Highway News and The Northerner are published in Fort St. John. Local free magazine Northern Groove focuses on local music, arts, and live entertainment events in Fort St. John and area and is published monthly. The EnergeticCity.ca is a digital outlet focused on local news in and around Fort St. John.

Radio stations broadcasting from Fort St. John include Move! 98.5 FM (CHRX-FM) (Variety), Bounce 101.5 FM (CKNL-FM) (Oldies), 92.5 Sunrise FM (CIAM-FM) (Religious) and 100.1 Moose FM (CKFU-FM) (Country).

Freedom of the City
The following People and Military Units have received the Freedom of the City of Fort St. John.

Individuals
 Charles “Bud” Hamilton: 7 December 1979.
 William James "Jim" Eglinski: 24 June 2019.
 The Honourable Senator Richard Neufeld: 24 June 2019.
 Jean Leahy: 9 September 2019.
 Sue Popesku: 11 June 2022.

Military Units
 2276 Royal Canadian Army Cadets: 10 April 2006.

References

External links

 
1794 establishments in the British Empire
Cities in British Columbia
Heritage sites in British Columbia
Hudson's Bay Company forts
National Historic Sites in British Columbia
North West Company forts
Populated places established in 1794